David Fitzsimmons (14 February 1875 – 1931) was a Scottish footballer. His regular position was as a half back. Born in Annbank, Ayrshire, he played for Annbank, Fairfield Athletic, Wigan County and two spells at Manchester United (then known as Newton Heath). His elder brother Tommy, a forward, also played for Newton Heath, Fairfield and Wigan.

References

External links
MUFCInfo.com profile

1875 births
1931 deaths
Date of death missing
Scottish footballers
Manchester United F.C. players
Fairfield Athletic F.C. players
Wigan County F.C. players
Association football midfielders
Annbank F.C. players
Footballers from South Ayrshire
English Football League players